The Cala s'Alguer is a traditional fishing village on the Costa Brava coast of Catalonia, Spain. It is part of the municipality of Palamós, in the comarca of Baix Empordà and the province of Girona. The historical complex has been declared a cultural asset of national interest. 

The settlement dates back to the 16th century, and reflects how much of the Costa Brava would have looked before the arrival of tourism. The fishermen's huts lie by the shoreline and are sheltered by wooded area above. The buildings were intended to store boats and fishing gear, with stone walls and Catalan-style ceramic vaults. They have terraces and natural ramps for mooring boats.

The GR 92 long distance footpath, which runs the length of the Mediterranean coast of Spain, passes behind and above the huts. To the south the path follows the coast past the old castle of Sant Esteve de Mar to the resort of La Fosca.

Gallery

References

Populated places in Baix Empordà